Ricardo Grutzmacher Ehle (born December 18, 1984 in São Borja), known as Ricardo Ehle, is a Brazilian footballer who plays as defender. He already played for national competitions such as Copa do Brasil and Campeonato Brasileiro Série D.

Career statistics

References

External links

1984 births
Living people
Brazilian footballers
Association football defenders
Campeonato Brasileiro Série D players
Associação Desportiva Confiança players
Associação Naval 1º de Maio players